Dark arts or dark art may refer to:

 Dark Arts (album), a 2016 album by The Killers bassist Mark Stoermer
 Dark Arts (Harry Potter), practiced in J. K. Rowling's Harry Potter novels
 "Dark Art", a song by Zach Hill from his 2008 album Astrological Straits
 "Dark Art", a song by Greek band Septicflesh from the 2017 album Codex Omega

See also
 Black art (disambiguation)
 Black magic, the use of supernatural powers for evil and selfish purposes
 Dark magic (disambiguation)